Straight and Crooked Thinking, first published in 1930 and revised in 1953, is a book by Robert H. Thouless which describes, assesses and critically analyses flaws in reasoning and argument. Thouless describes it as a practical manual, rather than a theoretical one.

Synopsis
Thirty-eight fallacies are discussed in the book. Among them are:

No. 3. proof by example, biased sample, cherry picking
No. 6. ignoratio elenchi: "red herring"
No. 9. false compromise/middle ground
No. 12. argument in a circle
No. 13. begging the question
No. 17. equivocation
No. 18. false dilemma: black and white thinking
No. 19. continuum fallacy (fallacy of the beard)
No. 21. ad nauseam: "argumentum ad nauseam" or "argument from repetition" or "argumentum ad infinitum"
No. 25. style over substance fallacy
No. 28. appeal to authority
No. 31. thought-terminating cliché
No. 36. special pleading
No. 37. appeal to consequences
No. 38. appeal to motive

See also

List of cognitive biases
List of common misconceptions
List of fallacies
List of memory biases
List of topics related to public relations and propaganda

References

1953 non-fiction books
Cognitive biases
Books about bias
Logic books